The University of Sydney School of Medicine, also known as Sydney Medical School (SMS) is the graduate medical school of the University of Sydney. Established in 1856, it is the first medical school in Australia. In 2018, Sydney Medical School joined the newly formed Faculty of Medicine and Health at the University of Sydney. SMS is ranked 19th in the world and second in Australia in the 2021 QS Subject Rankings for medicine.

The School has a large and diverse faculty to support its missions in education, research, and health care. Each year, it has over 1,100 medical students and 2,000 postgraduate students undertaking coursework and research-training programs.

History
Sydney Medical School was established in 1856 as The University of Sydney Faculty of Medicine by a group of University of Edinburgh Medical School graduates, Thomas Peter Anderson Stuart, Charles Nicholson and Alexander McCormick.

Sydney Medical Program

Sydney Medical School offers a four-year graduate medical program. Key course features include a hybrid problem-based learning model, early clinical exposure, online learning resources, and a focus on evidence-based medicine, which were modelled on aspects of the New Pathway Doctor of Medicine (MD) program at Harvard Medical School. The curriculum has won numerous teaching awards and is licensed to universities in the UK, South Africa and the Middle East and to other universities in Australia.

First introduced in 1997, the graduate medical program originally led to the degrees of Bachelor of Medicine and Bachelor of Surgery (MBBS) for historical reasons. Since 2014, the MD has replaced the MBBS as the title of the medical degree conferred by the Sydney Medical Program.

Entry into the Sydney Medical Program is on the basis of a satisfactory grade point average, the Graduate Australian Medical School Admissions Test score, and performance in a multiple mini-interview. Each year's cohort has approximately 300 students enrolled, an appreciable proportion of which are international students.

Undergraduate provisional entry
The School also offers an undergraduate-entry, "combined medicine" pathway, in which a provisional place is held in the Sydney Medical Program for students until they complete one of the following three-year undergraduate degrees at the University:
Bachelor of Commerce
Bachelor of Economics
Bachelor of Medical Science
Bachelor of Music Studies
Bachelor of Science (Advanced)

Securing such a place is highly competitive, as only around fifty such places are offered each year. Entry is on the basis of the Australian Tertiary Admission Rank (ATAR) or equivalent, and a semi-structured panel interview. For Music Studies-Medicine only, an additional audition at the Sydney Conservatorium of Music is required.

Since the introduction of this admissions pathway in 2005, the ATAR cut-off or equivalent has consistently been 99.95 (except for Music Studies-Medicine, which has been 99.50). the highest cut-off of any undergraduate-entry program offered in Australia.

Research activity
The School has a very large research base, with its disciplines and affiliated institutes actively engaged in research in both the basic sciences and all major areas of clinical medicine, through six major themes:
 Cancer
 Chronic Disease and Ageing
 Infection and Immunological Conditions
 Neurosciences and Mental Health
 Obesity, Diabetes and Cardiovascular Disease
 Reproductive, Maternal and Child Health

Sydney Health Ethics
Sydney Health Ethics, previously the Centre for Values, Ethics and the Law in Medicine (VELiM), is an independent centre associated with the School of Public Health in the Sydney Medical School. It has also been associated with the Unit for the History and Philosophy of Science in the Faculty of Science .

The Centre was established in 1995. It is a centre for academic research, for teaching and learning in bioethics and the medical humanities, and for ethical consultation and discussion.

Clinical schools and teaching hospitals
Sydney Medical School is supported by eight clinical schools, which are based at major teaching hospitals across New South Wales:
 Central Clinical School: Royal Prince Alfred Hospital
 Westmead Clinical School: Westmead Hospital
 The Children's Hospital at Westmead Clinical School: Royal Alexandra Hospital for Children
 Concord Clinical School: Concord Repatriation General Hospital
 Nepean Clinical School: Nepean Hospital
 Northern Clinical School: Royal North Shore Hospital
 School of Rural Health: Dubbo Base Hospital and Orange Base Hospital

A number of smaller hospitals also act as teaching hospitals.

Notable alumni

References

External links
Sydney Medical School
Sydney University Medical Society

 
Medicine
University of Sydney, Anderson Stuart building
Medical schools in Australia